General Heriberto Jara Corona (July 10, 1879 – April 17, 1968) was a Mexican revolutionary and politician who served as Governor of Veracruz.

Heriberto Jara was born in the town of Nogales, in the state of Veracruz, to Emilio Jara Andrade and María del Carmen Corona. He got enrolled in the Mexican Revolution while working at a factory in the municipality of Río Blanco in his native Veracruz.

The year Francisco I. Madero was elected President of Mexico he took over a seat in the Congress; then in 1916 he was elected again to serve in Congress and was one of the persons who drafted the 1917 Constitution. He served as Ambassador to Cuba and as Governor of Veracruz.
He was awarded the Stalin Peace Prize in 1950 and, in 1959, he received the Belisario Domínguez Medal of Honor. General Heriberto Jara International Airport in the port of Veracruz is named after him, as is the Stadium at Xalapa, built in 1925 on the grounds where William K. Boone had organized Olympic-style athletic games in 1922.

1879 births
1968 deaths
Governors of Veracruz
Governors of Tabasco
Members of the Chamber of Deputies (Mexico)
Ambassadors of Mexico to Cuba
Politicians from Veracruz
People of the Mexican Revolution
Recipients of the Belisario Domínguez Medal of Honor
Stalin Peace Prize recipients
Institutional Revolutionary Party politicians
20th-century Mexican politicians